Glendronach distillery is a Scottish whisky distillery located near Forgue, by Huntly, Aberdeenshire, in the Highland whisky district.  It was owned by the BenRiach Distillery Company Ltd. The name Glendronach derives from the Scottish Gaelic Gleann Dronach which means "valley of the brambles" or "valley of the blackberries".

The distillery was founded in 1826 by James Allardes (referred to often as Allardice) as the second distillery to apply for a licence to legally produce whisky under the Excise Act of 1823, which passed three years earlier and which allowed for the distilling of Whisky in Scotland. Other sources credit a consortium of farmers and businessmen for the foundation of the distillery though this could include Allardes. The Glendronach distillery was purchased by Teachers and Sons Ltd around 1960 who increased the number of stills from two to six. In 1996 the distillery was mothballed and reopened again in 2002 by Allied Distillers Limited.  In 2006 the distillery passed into the hands of Chivas Brothers Ltd (part of the Pernod Ricard group) and in 2008 it was sold to the BenRiach Distillery Company. Other notable owners include Walter Scott, who acquired it in 1881 and Charles Grant, son of the founder of the Glenfiddich distillery, in 1920.

The distillery draws its water from the Dronac burn within the distillery grounds. It has its own floor maltings and two wash stills in addition to two spirit stills.

The distillery is protected as a category B listed building.

In April 2016 Glendronach Distillery was purchased by the Brown-Forman Corporation. The deal included BenRiach and Glenglassaugh distilleries.

The core range of whiskies consists of expressions matured in ex-sherry casks, in particular oloroso and PX.

References

External links
 Official Glendronach website.

Distilleries in Scotland
Companies based in Aberdeenshire
Food and drink companies established in 1826
1826 establishments in Scotland
Category B listed buildings in Aberdeenshire
Listed distilleries in Scotland
Brown–Forman